Salim Aziz Durani  (born 11 December 1934) is a former Indian cricketer who played in 29 Test matches from 1960 to 1973. An all-rounder, Durani was a slow left-arm orthodox bowler and a left-handed batsman famous for his six-hitting prowess. He is the only Indian Test cricketer to have been born in Afghanistan.

Durani was the hero of India's series victory against England in 1961–62. He took 8 and 10 wickets in their wins at Kolkata and Chennai, respectively. Also, a decade later, he would be instrumental in India's maiden victory against the West Indies at Port of Spain, taking the wickets of Clive Lloyd and Gary Sobers.

In his 50 Test innings, he made just the one century, 104 against the West Indies in 1962. He played for Gujarat, Rajasthan and Saurashtra in first-class cricket. He made 14 hundreds in first-class cricket in which he managed 8545 runs at 33.37.  Durani had a special rapport with the spectators, who once agitated when he was dropped from the team for the Kanpur Test in 1973, with placards and slogans such as, "No Durani, no test!"

As he is the only Afghanistan-born Indian test cricketer he was present during the historic India vs Afghanistan test match on 14 June 2018.
He appeared in the film Charitra with Parveen Babi in 1973. He was the first cricketer to win an Arjuna Award. He was awarded the C.K. Nayudu Lifetime Achievement Award by the BCCI in 2011.

See also
 List of Test cricketers born in non-Test playing nations

References

External links

1934 births
Living people
India Test cricketers
Indian cricketers
Rajasthan cricketers
Central Zone cricketers
Saurashtra cricketers
Gujarat cricketers
Vazir Sultan Tobacco cricketers
Indian Starlets cricketers
Recipients of the Arjuna Award
Cricketers from Kabul
Afghan emigrants to India
Indian people of Pashtun descent
Cricketers who have acted in films